The Champion Medal was an Albanian award given to athletes in individual competitions or teams, who earned first place in a national championship, in the People's Socialist Republic of Albania.

Definition
The medal was given to adult athletes who performed in first level competitions. It had the shape of a five-pointed star in red, with sheaves of wheat forming a gold circle and inside the image two athletes (boy, girl), above which were written the initials R.P.SH. (Republika Popullore e Shqipërisë), with two small stars in each side.

See also
Sports titles system in Albania

References

Awards established in 1958
Medal